Cebu's at-large congressional district was the provincewide electoral district used to elect members of Philippine national legislatures in Cebu before 1987.

Cebu first elected its representatives at-large during the 1943 Philippine legislative election for a seat in the National Assembly of the Second Philippine Republic, with an additional seat allocated for its provincial governor and a separate district created for its capital Cebu City being a chartered city since 1937. Before 1943, the province including its capital city was represented in the national legislatures through its first, second, third, fourth, fifth, sixth and seventh districts. The province was also earlier represented in the Malolos Congress of the First Philippine Republic in 1898 by appointed delegates from Luzon.

The seven districts were restored in Cebu ahead of the 1941 Philippine House of Representatives elections whose elected representatives only began to serve following the dissolution of the Second Republic and the restoration of the Philippine Commonwealth in 1945. An at-large district would not be used in the province again until the 1984 Philippine parliamentary election for two seats in the Batasang Pambansa and another two seats for Cebu City's assembly district as a highly urbanized city entitled to its own representation. It became obsolete following the 1987 reapportionment under a new constitution that restored Cebu's first six congressional districts, eliminated the seventh district, and created two districts for Cebu City.

Representation history

See also
Legislative districts of Cebu

References

Former congressional districts of the Philippines
Politics of Cebu
1898 establishments in the Philippines
1901 disestablishments in the Philippines
1943 establishments in the Philippines
1944 disestablishments in the Philippines
1984 establishments in the Philippines
1986 disestablishments in the Philippines
At-large congressional districts of the Philippines
Congressional districts of Central Visayas
Constituencies established in 1898
Constituencies disestablished in 1901
Constituencies established in 1943
Constituencies disestablished in 1944
Constituencies established in 1984
Constituencies established in 1986